WARG (88.9 FM) is a radio station  broadcasting an Alternative format. It is licensed to Summit, Illinois, United States. The station is currently owned by Community High School District #217 and features programming from AP Radio.  It is run by students of Argo Community High School. WARG has its studios located inside the building on the third floor. The transmitter is located on the very top of the high school.

References

External links

ARG
High school radio stations in the United States